Al Kharrara (also spelled Al Harrarah) is a village in Qatar, located in the municipality of Al Wakrah. The closest sizable city is Mesaieed, located to the east. It is a desert area, characterized by high aridity and the presence of grazing animals such as dromedary camels, goats and sheep.

Etymology
The village's name comes from the Arabic "khar", which roughly means "the sound of running water". As the area consists of varying elevations and several hills, the process of surface runoff is very noticeable during the wet months.

Geography
Al Kharrara is situated in south-central Qatar. The villages of Al Aamriya and Umm Hawta in Al Rayyan Municipality are nearby to the west.

History
According to Richard H. Curtiss of the Washington Report, inscriptions dedicated to the pre-Islamic Nabataean god Manāt were found in Al Kharrara.

In J.G. Lorimer's 1908 publication Gazetteer of the Persian Gulf, he refers Al Kharrara as a Bedouin outpost that lies "20 miles south of Dohah and 6 from the east coast, between Naqiyān and Jabalat-at-Tuwar". He noted the presence of a masonry well, 27 fathoms deep, containing good water.

Industry
The Qatar Primary Materials Company has centered its dune sand extraction operations here due to the area's relatively large deposits.

Sports
The second stage of the Sealine Cross-Country Rally, which runs for 345.89 km, starts in Al Kharrara and ends in Sealine Beach (a section of Mesaieed).

Gallery

References

Populated places in Al Wakrah